Promechus splendens is a species of beetle belonging to the Chrysomelidae family.

Description
Pronotum is metallic green, while elytra are blue and yellow-orange.

Distribution
Promechus splendens occurs in Papua New Guinea.

References

 Universal Biological Indexer

Chrysomelinae
Beetles of Papua New Guinea
Beetles described in 1833
Taxa named by Félix Édouard Guérin-Méneville